Charadra is a genus of moths of the family Noctuidae.

Species
pata group:
Charadra cakulha Schmidt & Anweiler, 2010
Charadra coyopa Schmidt & Anweiler, 2010
Charadra franclemonti, Anweiler & Schmidt, 2010
Charadra oligarchia Dyar, 1916
Charadra pata (Druce, 1894)
Charadra patafex Dyar, 1916
Charadra tapa Schmidt & Anweiler, 2010
deridens group:
Charadra deridens (Guenée, 1952)
Charadra dispulsa Morrison, 1875
Charadra moneta Schmidt & Anweiler, 2010
Charadra nitens Schaus, 1911
nigracreta group
Charadra nigracreta H. Edwards, 1884

References
Charadra at funet

Pantheinae